Geoffrey Chalton Darks (28 June 1926 – ?? August 2004) was an English first-class cricketer who played seven times for Worcestershire after the Second World War. Only the first two of these games were in the County Championship; the others were against Cambridge University and Combined Services.

Darks' first wicket (his only one in 1946) was Leicestershire stalwart Jack Walsh. His best bowling by some distance was the 5–49 he claimed against Combined Services in May 1950; in no other first-class innings did he snare more than two victims. Not usually a productive batsman, with six single-figure scores in his eight innings (albeit three of those not out), he did however make 39 against Cambridge in the same match in late June 1950 in which he took his final wicket, that of David Sheppard.

Later in life, Darks became an umpire, although he never stood in a first-class game. His most important match in this regard was the Youth Test between England and West Indies at Stone in 1974, but he also umpired many of Warwickshire and Worcestershire's home Second XI games.

Darks was born in Bewdley, Worcestershire; he died at the age of 78 in Kidderminster in the same county.

External links
 
 Statistical summary from CricketArchive

1926 births
2004 deaths
English cricketers
Worcestershire cricketers
People from Bewdley
Sportspeople from Worcestershire